McDull, the Alumni is a 2006 Hong Kong live action/animated film directed by Samson Chiu. It is the third film adaptation of the popular McDull comic book series, following My Life as McDull, and McDull, Prince de la Bun. The film features a large ensemble cast of many of Hong Kong's cinematic icons.

The third film in the series finds McDull and his friends satirically exploring different roles in society.

Cast

 Albert Au
 Conroy Chan
 Jaycee Chan
 Bolin Chen
 Ronald Cheng
 Kelly Chen
 Cheung Chi-Kwong
 Cheung Siu-Fai
 Cheung Tat-Ming
 Chim Sui-man
 Dang Siu Juen
 Christopher Doyle
 Alex Fong
 Theresa Fu
 Ha Chun Chau
 Josie Ho
 Hui Shiu Hung
 Ji Jin Hee
 Lai Yiu-Cheung
 Jan Lamb
 Chet Lam
 Tats Lau
 Tiffany Lee
 Edmond Leung
 Gigi Leung
 Isabella Leong
 Lin Hoi
 Michael Miu
 Kary Ng
 Sandra Ng
 John Sham
 Eric Tsang
 Nicholas Tse
 Tsui Ting Yau
 Yip Wing-sie
 Hong Kong Sinfonietta
 Anthony Wong
 Wong You-Nam
 Miki Yeung
 Terence Yin
 Shawn Yue
 Jane Zhang
 Bibi Zhou
 Steven Cheung
 Dennis Mak
 Wong King-fung
 Yip San-yi
 Tsai Cheng-nan
 The Pancakes

References

External links

2006 films
Hong Kong animated films
Films based on comic strips
Yellow Bus
Chinese children's films
Cantonese-language films
McDull
2006 animated films
Films with live action and animation
Films directed by Samson Chiu
2000s Hong Kong films